Lepturidium is a genus of Cuban plants in the grass family.

The only known species is Lepturidium insulare. It is reported only from Isla de la Juventud (formerly called Isle of Pines), part of the Republic of Cuba.

References

Chloridoideae
Endemic flora of Cuba
Grasses of North America
Monotypic Poaceae genera
Isla de la Juventud
Taxa named by A. S. Hitchcock